The Socialist Republic of Serbia (SR Serbia), one of the republics of the Socialist Federal Republic of Yugoslavia, was led by the League of Communists of Yugoslavia and had the following Ministers of Internal Affairs during its existence 1945—1991:

See also
Minister of Internal Affairs (Principality of Serbia)
Minister of Internal Affairs (Kingdom of Serbia)
Minister of Internal Affairs (Serbia)

References

Socialist Republic of Serbia